The Flak 30 (Flugzeugabwehrkanone 30) and improved Flak 38 were 20 mm anti-aircraft guns used by various German forces throughout World War II. It was not only the primary German light anti-aircraft gun but by far the most numerously produced German artillery piece throughout the war. It was produced in a variety of models, notably the Flakvierling 38 which combined four Flak 38 autocannons onto a single carriage.

Development
The Germans fielded the unrelated early 2 cm Flak 28 just after World War I, but the Treaty of Versailles outlawed these weapons and they were sold to Switzerland.

The original Flak 30 design was developed from the Solothurn ST-5 as a project for the Kriegsmarine, which produced the 20 mm C/30. The gun fired the "Long Solothurn", a 20 × 138 mm belted cartridge that had been developed for the ST-5 and was one of the more powerful 20  mm rounds.

The C/30, featuring a barrel length of 65 calibres, had a fire rate of about 120 rounds per minute. Disappointingly, it proved to have feeding problems and would often jam, which was offset to some degree by its undersized 20 round-magazine which tended to make reloading a frequent necessity. Nevertheless, the C/30 became the primary shipborne light AA weapon and equipped a large variety of German ships. The MG C/30L variant was also used experimentally as an aircraft weapon, notably on the Heinkel He 112, where its high power allowed it to penetrate  armoured cars and the light tanks of the era during the Spanish Civil War.

Rheinmetall then started an adaptation of the C/30 for Army use, producing the 2 cm Flak 30. Generally similar to the C/30, the main areas of development were the mount, which was fairly compact. 

Set-up could be accomplished by dropping the gun off its two-wheeled trailer, "Sonderanhänger 51" (trailer 51) and levelling the gun using hand cranks. The result was a triangular base that permitted fire in all directions.

But the main problem with the design remained unsolved. The rate of fire of 120 RPM (rounds per minute) was not particularly fast for a weapon of this calibre. Rheinmetall responded with the 2 cm Flak 38, which was otherwise similar but increased the rate of fire by 220 RPM and slightly lowered overall weight to 420 kg. The Flak 38 was accepted as the standard Army gun in 1939, and by the Kriegsmarine as the C/38.

In order to provide airborne and mountain troops with an AA capability, Mauser was contracted to produce a lighter version of the Flak 38, which they introduced as the 2 cm Gebirgsflak 38 (2 cm GebFlak 38). It featured a dramatically simplified mount using a tripod that raised the entire gun off the ground, with the additional benefit of allowing the weapon to be set up on an uneven surface. These changes reduced the overall weight of the gun to 276.0 kg. Production started in 1941 and it entered service in 1942.

Ammunition
A range of 20x138B ammunition was manufactured for 2 cm Flak weapons, the more commonly used types are listed on the following table. Other types included practice rounds (marked Übung or Üb. in German notation) and a number of different AP types including a high-velocity PzGr 40 round with a tungsten carbide core in an aluminium body.

2 cm Flakvierling 38

Even as the Flak 30 was entering service, the Luftwaffe and Heer (army) branches of the Wehrmacht had doubts about its effectiveness, given the ever-increasing speeds of low-altitude fighter-bombers and attack aircraft. The Army in particular felt the proper solution was the introduction of the 37 mm calibre weapons they had been developing since the 1920s, which had a rate of fire about the same as the Flak 38 but fired a round with almost eight times the weight. This not only made the rounds deadlier on impact, but their higher energy and ballistic coefficient allowed them to travel much longer distances, allowing the gun to engage targets at longer ranges. This meant it could keep enemy aircraft under fire over longer time spans.

The 20 mm weapons had always had weak development perspectives, often being reconfigured or redesigned just enough to allow the weapons to find a use. Indeed, it came as a surprise when Rheinmetall introduced the 2 cm Flakvierling 38, which improved the weapon just enough to make it competitive again. The term Vierling literally translates to "quadruplet" and refers to the four 20 mm autocannon constituting the design.

The Flakvierling weapon consisted of quad-mounted 2 cm Flak 38 AA guns with collapsing seats, folding handles, and ammunition racks. The mount had a triangular base with a jack at each leg for levelling the gun. The tracker traversed and elevated the mount manually using two handwheels. When raised, the weapon measured 307 cm (10 feet 1 inch) high.

Each of the four guns had a separate magazine that held only 20 rounds. This meant that a maximum combined rate of fire of 1,400 rounds per minute was reduced practically to 800 rounds per minute for combat use – which would still require that an emptied magazine be replaced every six seconds, on each of the four guns. This is the attainable rate of fire; the sustained rate of fire is significantly lower due to heat buildup and barrel erosion. Automatic weapons are typically limited to roughly 100 rounds per minute per barrel to give time for the heat to dissipate, although this can be exceeded for short periods if the firing window is brief.

The gun was fired by two pedals — each of which fired two diametrically opposite barrels — in either semi-automatic or automatic mode. The effective vertical range was 2,200 metres. It was also used just as effectively against ground targets as it was against low-flying aircraft.

Mounting versatility

The Flakvierling four-autocannon anti-aircraft ordnance system, when not mounted into any self-propelled mount, was normally transported Sd. Ah. 52 trailer, and could be towed behind a variety of half-tracks or trucks, such as the Opel Blitz and the armoured Sd.Kfz. 251 and unarmored Sd.Kfz. 7/1 and Sd.Kfz. 11 artillery-towing half-track vehicles. Its versatility concerning the vehicles it could be mounted to included its use even on tank hulls to produce fully armoured mobile anti-aircraft vehicles, such as the Panzer IV-based low-production Wirbelwind and original Möbelwagen prototype-design, anti-aircraft tanks. In Kriegsmarine use, it was fitted to U-boats, Siebel ferries and ships to provide short-range anti-aircraft defence, and was also employed in fixed installations around ports, harbours and other strategic naval targets. The Flakvierling was also a common fixture on trains, even on Hitler's own command train, where pairs of them were mounted on either end of a "camelback" flatbed car and then covered to make it look like a boxcar, sometimes with a pair of such twin-Flakvierling mount cars for defence, one near each end of Hitler's Führersonderzug train.

Users

 150 Flak 30 (20 mm lėktuvinis automatinis pabūklas LAP) bought in 1939.
 50 Flak 30 (named 20 Itk/30 BSW) delivered from Germany in 1939. 113 Flak 38 (named 20 ItK/38 BSW) guns bought during the Continuation War.
 108 total in service
 300 ordered in September 1940, the delivery beginning in May 1941, known as Gustloff guns (after one of their manufacturers)
 69 in service from 1945 to 1955 in The Royal Danish Navy, where it was known as 20 mm Mk M/39 LvSa, mounted on minesweepers of the SØLØVE class and motor torpedo boats of the GLENTEN class.
 56 Flak 30 bought in 1939, designated 20 mm lvakan m/39 in Swedish service.

See also
List of anti-aircraft guns
List of artillery of Germany
MG 151 cannon - German 20mm aircraft cannon developed during World War II.
MG FF cannon - German 20mm aircraft cannon during early World War II.  Developed from the Swiss Oerlikon FF.
2 cm KwK 30 - variant for armored cars and light tanks, slightly shortened barrel
20 mm Polsten - Equivalent British 20mm anti-aircraft gun, developed from a Polish design which was, in turn, derived from a version of the Swiss Oerlikon,  The blueprints were brought to Britain by its creators after Invasion of Poland.
Breda Model 35 - Equivalent Italian 20mm anti-aircraft gun.
Hispano-Suiza HS.404 - Equivalent French-designed 20mm anti-aircraft gun used by many countries during World War II (also used to arm various aircraft).
Type 98 20 mm AA machine cannon - Japanese 20mm anti-aircraft gun during World War II.
Type 2 20 mm AA machine cannon - Japanese 20mm anti-aircraft gun derived from the German Flak 38 during World War II, supplementing the earlier Type 98.

Similar
M45 Quadmount, the closest Allied equivalent to the Flakvierling system

Notes

References

Bibliography
 Gander, Terry and Chamberlain, Peter. Weapons of the Third Reich: An Encyclopedic Survey of All Small Arms, Artillery and Special Weapons of the German Land Forces 1939-1945. New York: Doubleday, 1979 
 Hogg, Ian V. German Artillery of World War Two. 2nd corrected edition. Mechanicsville, PA: Stackpole Books, 1997

External links

 Images and models of the 2 cm FlaK at Pinterest
 Image of the 2 cm FlaK 38 Anti Aircraft Gun in Desert camouflage at the Australian war memorial page

20 mm artillery
Autocannon
Naval anti-aircraft guns
Anti-aircraft guns of Germany
Artillery of Switzerland
World War II anti-aircraft guns
World War II artillery of Germany
World War II military equipment of Greece
Rheinmetall
Military equipment introduced in the 1930s

ko:Flak 38
no:Flak 38